Katukukke  is a village in Kasaragod district in the state of Kerala, India..The famous Shri Subraya Deva Temple present in this village so the village got the name Katukukke.

Demographics
As of 2011 Census, Kattukukke village had population of 3,955 which constitutes 2,002 males and 1,953 females. The male female sex ratio was 976 lower than kerala state average of 1084. Population in the age group 0-6 was 365 (9.2%) where 193 are males and 172 are females. Kattukukke had overall literacy of 87.2% lower than state average of 94% where male literacy stands at 92.3% and female literacy was 82.1%.

Transportation
Local roads have access to National Highway No.66 which connects to Mangalore in the north and Calicut in the south.  The nearest railway station is Manjeshwar on Mangalore-Palakkad line. There is an airport at Mangalore.

Languages
This locality is an essentially multi-lingual region. The main languages spoke here are Kannada and Tulu. The people also speak Malayalam, Havyaka, Beary bashe and Konkani.

Administration
This village is part of Manjeshwar (State Assembly constituency) which is again part of Kasaragod (Lok Sabha constituency)

References

Manjeshwar area